Victoria Azarenka was the defending champion, but chose not to participate this year.

Kim Clijsters won in the final 6–3, 4–6, 7–6(8–6), against her compatriot Justine Henin, saving two match points in the third set. Henin marked her return from the tournament after her first retirement.

Seeds

  Kim Clijsters (champion)
  Nadia Petrova (first round)
  Ana Ivanovic (semifinals)
  Daniela Hantuchová (quarterfinals)
  Alisa Kleybanova (first round)
  Aleksandra Wozniak (second round)
  Melinda Czink (quarterfinals)
  Iveta Benešová (first round)

Draw

Finals

Top half

Bottom half

External links
Main draw
Qualifying draw

Singles
2010 WTA Tour